The 2012 Asian Women's Handball Championship was the 14th Asian Championship, which took place from 7 to 16 December 2012 in Yogyakarta, Indonesia.
It acted as the Asian qualifying tournament for the 2013 World Women's Handball Championship in Serbia.

Draw

Preliminary round
All times are local (UTC+7).

Group A

Group B

Placement 9th–12th

9th–12th semifinals

11th/12th

9th/10th

Placement 5th–8th

5th–8th semifinals

7th/8th

5th/6th

Final round

Semifinals

Bronze medal match

Gold medal match

Final standing

References

Results

External links
www.asianhandball.org
Results at todor66

Asian
Hand
International sports competitions hosted by Indonesia
2012
December 2012 sports events in Asia